Paul Popplewell (born 18 April 1977) is a British actor having played Simon in the BBC television drama Criminal (1994), Happy Mondays  Paul Ryder in 24 Hour Party People (2001), Tyrannosaur, Black Mirror Fifteen Million Merits (2011), and as Paul Pegg in Casualty (2021-2023).

Early life and career
Popplewell landed his first role as an actor at age 16, playing lead role of Simon in the BBC television drama Criminal; The film was about a boy who with undiagnosed autism and from a council estate background in Bradford. for which he won Best Actor at the Golden Chest Film Festival and was nominated for Best Actor at the Royal Television Society Awards.

At the age of 20, Popplewell was playing a leading role with the Royal Shakespeare Company in their production of Bad Weather at The Other Place (theatre) in Stratford-upon-Avon, Warwickshire.,

In 2001, he played Happy Mondays bassist and founder member Paul Ryder in the Michael Winterbottom film 24 Hour Party People. He later made an appearance in the music video for the Oasis single "Lyla" in 2005.

In 2011, Popplewell played the character of Bod in the BIFA and BAFTA winning feature film Tyrannosaur, which was written and directed by Paddy Considine, and also starred Olivia Colman, Peter Mullan and Eddie Marsan.

Since 2021, he has played the receptionist, Paul Pegg in the BBC One drama Casualty.

Personal life
Popplewell runs long distance to raise money for charity.

Filmography

Film
Peterloo (2018) - Mill Overseer
Journeyman (2017) - Jackie
On the Road (Wolf Alice) (2016)
ID2: Shadwell Army (2016) - Danny Boy
The Goob (2014) - Levi
'71 (2014) - Training Corporal
The Cost of Living (2013, Short) - Mark
The Look of Love (2013) - Journalist No. 1
Spike Island (2012) - Roses' Manager
Tyrannosaur (2011) - Bod
The Trip (2010) - Paul
Dog Altogether (2007, Short) - Pub Youth 1
The Waiting Room (2007) - Van Man
Bright Young Things (2003) - Private
In This World (2002) - (Europe) (voice)
Heartlands (2002) - Gulliver's Kingdom Soldier (uncredited)
Morvern Callar (2002) - Cat in the Hat
24 Hour Party People (2002) - Paul Ryder
Club Le Monde (2002) - Dil
The Man with Rain in His Shoes (1998) - Simon
I Want You (1998) - Phonebox Man
FairyTale: A True Story (1997) - Second Soldier

Television

Kids Court (1992, BSKYB)
Criminal (1994, BBC) - Simon
Out of The Blue (1995, BBC) - Eddie Locke
Island (1996, ITV)
Hetty Wainthropp Investigates (1997, BBC) - Frank Starling
Peak Practice (2000, BBC) - Greg Crinham
The League of Gentlemen (2000, BBC) - Collier
Heartbeat (2000, ITV) - Gary
Doctors (2000, BBC) - Jamie Farrell
The Bill (2001, BBC) - Patient
Alan Partridge (2001, BBC)
Rehab (2003, BBC Movie) - Phillip
Gifted (2003, ITV Movie) - Sean Dwyer
Totally Frank (2005, Channel 4) - Television Producer
The Somme (2005, Channel 4, documentary) - Greenhalgh
The Ghost Squad (2005, BBC) - DC Richard Ellis
The Royal (2005-2009, ITV) - Marlon Barratt / Chris Nugent
Simon Schama's Power of Art (2006, BBC, documentary) - Caravaggio
The Wedge (2006, ITV)
Saxondale (2007, BBC) - Freaky Dan
Emmerdale (2008, ITV) - Keith Lodge
The Trip (2010, BBC) - Paul
Waterloo Road (2011, BBC) - Callum Pearson
Black Mirror'''s Fifteen Million Merits (2011, Channel 4) - DustinInside Men (2012, BBC) - TomAccused (2012, BBC) - GaryShameless (2012, Channel 4) - EddieFrankie (2013, BBC) - Tony PrestonMoving On (2013, BBC) - NathanA Young Doctor's Notebook (2013, Sky Arts Playhouse Presents) - YuriOur World War (2014, BBC) - Sergeant MitchellThe Salisbury Poisonings (2020, BBC) - DI Ben MantSave Me (2020, Sky Atlantic) - DC Mark HarperCasualty'' (2021-2023, BBC) - Paul Pegg

Theatre
The Last Testament of Lillian Bilocca - City of Culture 
The Hypocrite - Royal Shakespeare Company (RSC)
A Taste of Honey - Manchester Royal Exchange Theatre
Toast - Hull Truck
The Arbor - The Royal Court
Harvest - The Royal Court
The Shy Gas Man - Southwark Playhouse
Under The Whaleback - Hull Truck
The Modernists - Sheffield Crucible Theatre
American Buffalo - Manchester Royal Exchange Theatre
The Tempest - Royal Shakespeare Company (RSC)
Bad Weather - Royal Shakespeare Company (RSC)
Bartholomew Fair - Royal Shakespeare Company (RSC)

Awards and nominations

References

External links

voice agent
Criminal 1994

1977 births
Living people
People from the East Riding of Yorkshire
English male film actors
English male television actors
English male stage actors
Male actors from Yorkshire